Gonbad-e Pir Mohammad (also Romanized as Gonbad-e Pīr Moḩammad and Gonbad Pīr Moḩammad; also known as Emāmzādeh Pīr Moḩad, Emāmzādeh Pīr Moḩammad, Īmāmzādeh Pīr Mohad, Īmamzade Pīr Mohan, and Pīr Moḩammad) is a village in Chamzey Rural District, in the Central District of Malekshahi County, Ilam Province, Iran. At the 2006 census, its population was 1,766, in 341 families. The village is populated by Kurds.

References 

Populated places in Malekshahi County
Kurdish settlements in Ilam Province